Gagarin is a rural locality (a village) in Terebayevskoye Rural Settlement, Nikolsky District, Vologda Oblast, Russia. The population was 4 as of 2002.

Geography 
The distance to Nikolsk is 13 km, to Terebayevo is 5 km. Burakovo is the nearest rural locality.

References 

Rural localities in Nikolsky District, Vologda Oblast